The School of Hospitality Business is an industry-specific school within the Eli Broad College of Business at Michigan State University. Founded in 1927 as the nation's first business-based hotel training course, The School of Hospitality Business now has 579 undergraduate students and 21 faculty members.

Students in The School earn more than $300,000 each academic year in merit-based scholarships.

History
MSU's School of Hospitality Business was founded in 1927 when the Education Committee of the Michigan Hotel Association met to discuss development of a college-level hotel management school, after which Michigan State approved a hotel training course. When classes started, there were 18 students majoring in the hotel training course.

In 1947, the W. K. Kellogg Foundation granted $1.4 million for construction of the Kellogg Hotel and Conference Center.  That year, the program was also divided into three major areas of concentration: hotel management, restaurant management, and institutional management.

In 1951, Kellogg Center for Continuing Education was opened. The first general manager was Weldon Garrison, a 1946 graduate of The School of Hospitality Business. The school's offices were moved to the Kellogg Center, enrollment increased to approximately 300, and the Les Gourmets dinner-dance was founded as annual event.

In the 1960s, the Eppley Foundation granted the university $1.5 million to build the Eugene C. Eppley Center for Graduate Studies in Hotel, Restaurant and Institutional Management. The school is still housed in this building. The School became the first program in the country to offer a Master of Business Administration (MBA) degree in hotel, restaurant and institutional management, and enrollment reached 550.

In the 1980s, CAREER EXPO, the nation's leading hospitality career fair, was founded. Enrollment eclipsed 1,000. Dr. Ronald F. Cichy, an alumnus of the school, was appointed director of the school. The Visiting Distinguished Chefs Series was founded.

In the 1990s, the Hilton Lecture Series was founded, the school’s internship office was renamed the Student and Industry Resource Center (SIRC) and was endowed for $1 million, the First Annual Hospitality Association/Alumni Association Auction was held in the Kellogg Center, the Michael L. Minor Master of Science in Food Service Management was launched as a complement to the school’s MBA in hospitality business, and the Hospitality Association offered its first Vegas Night.

In the 2000s, the school became independent within the Eli Broad College of Business, the school's Alumni Association published 75th anniversary history book The Legacy of the Leader, the master's degree in hospitality business and the graduate specialization in hospitality business were launched, and faculty developed and launched the Hospitality Business Real Estate and Development Specialization for undergraduates.

In 2014, the school launched 12 mini-courses that will be only available online, such as "Introduction to Hospitality and Information Systems," "Private Club and Gaming Operations," and "Foodservice and Lodging Operations." "These mini-courses feature the same content found in the three full 8-week courses, enabling students to complete the same Management Certificate in the Business of Hospitality credential in smaller segments.

Programs
The School of Hospitality Business offers the following programs:

Bachelor of Arts (B.A.) in Hospitality Business
Minor in Hospitality Business Real Estate Investment Management

Faculty
Among universities specifically with degree-granting hospitality programs, MSU was ranked ninth (or seventh among such universities in the United States), in terms of weighted-publication-count (2002-2006) in English-language research journals specific to the hospitality industry.  The School’s faculty was ranked number one by the Journal of Hospitality & Tourism Research in “mean productivity” from 1992–2001, and in having "the most intensely" contributing authors amongst the Top 20 universities.  In another study, reported on by the Journal of Hospitality & Tourism Education, a half dozen faculty members of The School of Hospitality Business were named among “Hospitality’s Most Influential Scholars.”  The faculty also received the 2006 Richard J. Lewis Quality of Excellence Award for outstanding leadership.

Notable faculty include:
 Dr. Michael Kasavana, a leading expert on hospitality information technology. He has authored 6 books, coined the phrase "v-commerce," and is considered the world's expert on this concept. Dr. Kasavana is the recipient of the MSU Distinguished Faculty Award, and was the first recipient of a Distinguished Achievements Award from FS/TEC.
 Dr. Bonnie Knutson, an authority on consumer lifestyle and buying trends, strategic marketing, and marketing research. She is currently the editor of the Journal of Hospitality and Marketing, a national scholar of the National Advertising Foundation, a winner of the Golden Key Teaching Excellence Award, and the coveted Withrow Award for excellence in teaching and research.
 Dr. Jack Ninemeier, the author of 42 books utilized both in the industry and in classrooms around the world.
 Dr. Raymond Schmidgall, the Hilton Hotels Professor of Hospitality Financial Management and an accounting and financial management expert. He has authored 2 books on the topics of hospitality accounting and finance currently used at leading hospitality institutions around the world.

Students
Students team with faculty and the alumni association to produce several major events each year:
 Career Expo, one of the longest-running career fairs on campus. Hospitality companies attend this fall semester event to recruit students as interns and permanent employees.
 The annual Destination Auction, the main fundraising event for the student Hospitality Association. A portion of the proceeds of this event are given to local charities.
 Les Gourmets, a black-tie, seven-course reception and dinner each spring that showcases the talents of hundreds of students.

Undergraduate students have the opportunity to join the Spartan Sponsors Mentor Program, which pairs each student with an alumnus/a who shares the student's career interest to provide advice, knowledge, support and shared connections. The relationship is maintained throughout the student's undergraduate education.

See also  
 Ranking of university programs in Hospitality Management

References

External links
The School of Hospitality Business official website

Michigan State University
Hospitality schools in the United States
Educational institutions established in 1927
1927 establishments in Michigan